James Turner (born October 9, 1989) is an American retired soccer player who last played for Orange County Blues FC in the USL Professional Division.

External links
 USL Pro profile

1989 births
Living people
American soccer players
UC Irvine Anteaters men's soccer players
Orange County Blue Star players
Orange County SC players
Soccer players from California
USL League Two players
USL Championship players
Association football defenders